The Rush Creek Regional Trail is a bicycle trail in Minnesota that runs from the Coon Rapids Dam in Brooklyn Park to Elm Creek Park Reserve in Maple Grove. The trail runs  and is maintained by Three Rivers Park District.

Route description 
Rush Creek Trail starts at the Coon Rapids Dam in Brooklyn Park. The trail heads west and goes through the West Coon Rapids Dam Visitor Center parking lot. The trail then crosses the Mississippi River Trail (MRT, also known as the West River Parkway). The trail then starts heading through rural north Brooklyn Park. The trail crosses both Noble Parkway, where it also crosses the Shingle Creek Regional Trail, and Zane Avenue via tunnels. The trail crosses Winnetka Avenue and then goes over US Highway 169 via a bridge right before exiting Brooklyn Park into Maple Grove. The trail crosses Jefferson Highway via a stoplight-controlled crosswalk. The terrain in Maple Grove is very different from Brooklyn Park. Maple Grove's is more a northern look—a lot of trees—where Brooklyn Park has more of a farm look. The trail crosses James Dean Parkway at the Elm Creek Park Preserve. The trail then goes through the park and ends at Medicine Lake Trail.

Future 
The three rivers park district is planning on extending the Rush creek trail to Crow hassen park in Hassan Township

See also

References

Bike paths in Minnesota